Packsize is an American corrugated material manufacturer and on-demand packaging system provider for businesses with complex corrugated packaging needs. The business is headquartered in Salt Lake City, Utah and has operations in United States, Canada, United Kingdom, Germany, and the Scandinavia . It serves customers in 21 countries.

History 
Packsize International LLC was founded in the USA in 2002. In 2007, Intermountain West investment firm Peterson Partners made a $4.6 million investment in Packsize. Packsize founder and CEO Hanko Kiessner received the Ernst & Young Entrepreneur of the Year Award 2008 in the Manufacturing/Distribution category in the Pacific Northwest.

Business Model 
Packsize established Right-sized Packaging on Demand as its business model. Through this model, Packsize retains ownership of its technology giving the company a long-term stake in its customers’ packaging performance as well as continued revenue. p . T 

Packsize’s Right-sized Packaging on Demand business model includes using its On Demand Packaging system. Packsize coined the term On Demand Packaging to identify and distinguish its unique system from typical box systems. The On Demand Packaging system eliminates the need for large inventories of pre-ordered cardboard boxes and minimizes the amount of packaging filler needed, if any. Packsize’s On Demand Packaging system includes a box making machine, software and corrugated material. Product dimensions are entered into the box making machine. The machine cuts, creases and scores the corrugated material to the exact specifications to create a customized box specifically optimized for the product. As a result, less packaging material and void fill are required to safely package items. The On Demand Packaging system also reduces the space required for packaging material inventory and shipping costs.

References

External links 
 packsize.com - official site

Companies based in Salt Lake City
2002 establishments in Utah